Frederick "Eric" Moore is an American politician who served as a member of the Montana Legislature. He was first elected on November 2, 2010 to Senate District 20.

Early life and education 
Moore, originally from Colorado, Moore earned a Bachelor of Science degree in agriculture science from Montana State University.

Career 
In the 2011 session, Moore was appointed to the Business & Labor, Education, and Agriculture committees. In 2013, he served as a majority whip. Moore served District 20 until being redistricted in 2015, and now represents District 37, which includes all of Carter, Garfield, McCone, and Prairie Counties, and parts of Fallon, Powder River and Wibaux Counties, Montana. Moore has also served as president pro tempore of the Senate.

Personal life 
He lives in Custer County, Montana with his wife Lea and their two children.

Montana State Legislature

2010 Montana Senate election

Moore was uncontested in the general election, having received 5,828 votes.

2014 Montana Senate election

Moore was uncontested in the primary election, having received 3,159 votes.

2018 Montana House of Representatives election

Moore was uncontested in the primary election, having received 2,693 votes.

Moore was also uncontested in the general election, having received 4,746 votes.

2020 Montana House of Representatives election

References

External links
 Home page

Living people
Year of birth missing (living people)
Republican Party Montana state senators
Montana State University alumni
People from Miles City, Montana
21st-century American politicians